The Jack LaLanne Show was an American exercise television show hosted by Jack LaLanne that ran from 1951 to 1985.

Background 
Beginning in 1951, the program was broadcast locally on KGO-TV in San Francisco. After it was picked up for national syndication in 1959, it became the longest-running exercise program.

Format 
Vincent LoBrutto, in his book, TV in the USA, described LaLanne as "one of early television's great pitchmen", saying that he was "full of charisma and vitality and determined to make everyone look and feel better." He engaged viewers in conversation and used items like rubber cords, chairs, and broomsticks when he needed props for exercises.

LaLanne often used his white German shepherd dog, Happy, in his program. The dog's tricks attracted children to the program, so that LaLanne could say to the children: "You go get Mother or Daddy, Grandmother, Grandfather, whoever is in the house. You go get them, and you make sure they exercise with me."

References

External links

1950s American television series
1960s American television series
1970s American television series
1980s American television series
1951 American television series debuts
1985 American television series endings
Black-and-white American television shows
English-language television shows
Exercise television shows
First-run syndicated television programs in the United States